Michell is a surname. Notable people with the surname include:

Anthony Michell (1870–1959), Australian mechanical engineer
Bert S. Michell (c.1882–1938), American horse racing trainer
Charles Collier Michell (1793–1851), British soldier, first surveyor-general in the Cape, road engineer, architect, artist and naturalist
Chris Michell (born 1951), English flautist and composer
Edith Michell (1872–1951), English chess master
Edward Michell (1843–1926), English rower and barrister
Edward Michell (cricketer) (1853–1900), English batsman
Frederick Thomas Michell (1788-1873) Royal Navy admiral and mayor of Totnes
Helena Michell (born 1963), Australian actress
Howard Michell (1913–2012), Australian wool merchant, industrialist and philanthropist
John Michell (disambiguation)
John Michell (1724–1793), English natural philosopher and geologist
John Michell (writer) (1933–2009), English author on esotericism
John Henry Michell (1863–1940), Australian mathematician
Keith Michell (1928–2015), Australian actor
Matthew Michell (1705–1752), English politician
Nicholas Michell (1807–1880), Cornish writer
Reginald Pryce Michell (1873–1938), English chess master
Richard Rooke Michell (1810–1872), Cornish mining proprietor
Robert Michell (disambiguation), several people
Roger Michell (1956–2021), English theatre, television and film director
Tony Michell (born 1947), British businessman, entrepreneur, and pioneer for Korean development
Sampson Michell (1755-1809) British admiral in charge of Portuguese navy, father of  CC Michell and F T Michell
Tris Vonna Michell (born 1982), British artist
William Michell (1796–1872), British physician and Member of Parliament

See also 
Michell solution, a general solution to the elasticity equations in polar coordinates
Michell turbine, a water turbine
Mitchell (surname)

English-language surnames
Surnames of English origin
Patronymic surnames